is a former Japanese professional baseball outfielder.

External links

1965 births
Living people
Fukuoka Daiei Hawks players
Hanshin Tigers players
Japanese baseball coaches
Japanese expatriate baseball players in the United States
Nankai Hawks players
Nippon Professional Baseball coaches
Nippon Professional Baseball outfielders
People from Kurashiki
Seibu Lions players
Sonoma County Crushers players
Baseball people from Okayama Prefecture